Lena Martell (born Helen Thomson; 15 May 1940) is a Scottish singer, with a long career in theatre, television and musicals. She has recorded thirty albums which include the number one UK single with "One Day at a Time" in 1979.

Biography
Martell was born in Possilpark, Glasgow on 15 May 1940. She began singing at the age of 11 with her eldest brother's band. She became a singer for the Jimmie McGregor Band at the Barrowland Ballroom, Glasgow. After his untimely death, she decided to pursue a career in music as a tribute. She released a number of standards in the 1970s on the Pye record label, drew crowds at cabarets and concert halls and became a major recording star with silver, gold and platinum awards. Her cover of the song "One Day at a Time", written by Marijohn Wilkin and Kris Kristofferson, reached the top of the UK Singles Chart for three weeks in October 1979. She placed six albums in the UK Albums Chart between 1974 and 1980, including four that reached the top 20.

In the 1970 and 1980s her Saturday Night TV shows for BBC Television ran over a period of ten years, with evening audiences of over 12 million. Moving to the US she sang in New York and Las Vegas with Frank Sinatra, Sammy Davis Jr. and others and toured the world performing in concert halls. She has starred in musicals in Broadway, first when deputising for Barbra Streisand, and headlining in London`s West End theatres. Her successes at London Palladium equalled the box office of Shirley MacLaine and Bette Midler.

Although out of the limelight for a period while nursing her sick mother, Martell returned to the music industry.  She has released a few albums on the ScotDisc label. Her double album One Day at a Time: An Anthology of Song was released on Castle Records in 2003.

Health
Martell has had surgery to replace a valve in her heart, and in March 2008 underwent a triple heart bypass operation.

Discography

Albums

Studio albums

Compilation albums

Singles

See also
List of artists who reached number one on the UK Singles Chart
List of performers on Top of the Pops
List of one-hit wonders on the UK Singles Chart

References

External links
Profile, IMDb.com. Retrieved 30 August 2015.

1940 births
Living people
20th-century Scottish women singers
Musicians from Glasgow
People from Possilpark